The 2021 Yokohama mayoral election was held on 22 August 2021 to elect the next mayor of Yokohama. The central issue in the election was the building of an "integrated resort" IR featuring a casino. 

Incumbent mayor Fumiko Hayashi lost reelection, placing third to the LDP supported Hachiro Okonogi and the eventual winner, CDP and JCP supported Takeharu Yamanaka.

Candidates
A total of 8 candidates registered candidacies for the election.

Results

References

External links
Information: Elections - City of Yokohama (Japanese)

Mayoral elections in Japan
August 2021 events in Japan
Yokohama